Rocky Chack (Japanese: ロッキー・チャック Rokkī Chakku, sometimes stylized as ROCKY CHACK) is a Japanese band founded in 1998 and composed of Taro Yamashita (as "Taro") and Noe Arima (as "noe").

History 

Rocky Chack was formed in 1998 as a 5-person band and signed under the label Midi, Inc. In 2000, the band left Midi and signed with outgroup records (a division of Sony Music). However, after their label dissolved in October 2000, the band was put on hiatus. In late 2005, Taro and noe announced they would continue the band as a duo, and has since released music under the Victor Entertainment FlyingDog label.

In 2006, Rocky Chack performed the ending songs to the Japanese anime series Zegapain, along with the ending songs of Spice and Wolf in 2008 and its sequel in 2009.

Members

Current 
 Taro (Vocals) - , Birthplace: Kitakyushu, Japan.
 noe (Vocals & Keyboard) - , Birthplace: Tokyo, Japan.

Former 
 Ichiro Fujishima (Bass)
 Tamaki Kosugi (Drums)
 Ikuya Taira (Guitar) - Left in 1999.

Discography

Singles

Albums

References

External links
 
 

Musical groups established in 1998
Japanese musical duos